El Viaje de Rose (it could be translated as “The Rose’s Journey”) are a Spanish pop-rock band from Badajoz, Extremadura. The band is led by Ana Broncano, the singer. The name El Viaje de Rose is due to the fact that Ana saw a poster of the film Titanic when they were thinking about the name of the band

The band was created in 2004 and Broncano's lyrics have frequent allusions to love and social problems. Well-known songs by El Viaje de Rose include "Deseo", "No se puede matar al amor", "Tras la vida", "Caos", "Ayúdame" and "Perdíteis". The highest moment in the band's career was probably reached with the release of their album Guía de ciudades invisibles, whose single “Deseo” had a significant success in the Concurso Coca-Cola in 2007.

Band members

Current 
Ana Broncano: voice and acoustic guitar
David González: keyboard and chorus
David Capellán: Electric guitar and solo
Alberto Banderas: bass
Daniel Cardiel: drums

Past 
 Guitar:
 Javier Vega.
 Bass:
 Adolfo Campini
 Borja Murillo Soto
 Michel Martínez Valdés

Timeline

Discography

 Primera Maqueta (2005)
 Guía de Ciudades Invisibles (2007)
 El Viaje de Rose (2013)

See also
 El Sueño de Morfeo
 La Oreja de Van Gogh
 Jesse & Joy

Notes

References

External links 
 El Viaje de Rose (Official website)
 “Perdísteis” en el Festival Guoman
 Entrevista en “Wakai”
 “Tras la Vida” en la Sala Aftasí
El Viaje de Rose presenta nuevo disco en la Sala Aftasí

Spanish rock music groups
Musicians from Extremadura
Rock en Español music groups
Musical groups established in 2004